Aleksandr Sergeyevich Salugin (born 23 October 1988) is a Russian former footballer who played as a forward.

Club career
He made his professional debut for PFC CSKA Moscow on 5 May 2005 in a return leg of the UEFA Cup semifinal against Parma, substituting Vágner Love in the 88th minute. CSKA eventually won the cup, Salugin did not appear in the final.

He made his Russian Premier League debut for CSKA on 18 September 2005 in a game against FC Saturn Ramenskoye.

Until 18 October 2009, he was the youngest player ever to score a goal in the Russian Premier League (he scored a goal for PFC CSKA Moscow on 19 November 2005 in a game against FC Alania Vladikavkaz when he was 17 years 27 days old). That record was surpassed by Zhano Ananidze.

Career statistics

Club

Notes

References

External links 
 Profile by onedivision.ru (in Russian)
 
 

1988 births
Footballers from Moscow
Living people
Russian footballers
Association football forwards
Russia youth international footballers
Russia under-21 international footballers
Russian expatriate footballers
Expatriate footballers in Belarus
PFC CSKA Moscow players
UEFA Cup winning players
PFC Krylia Sovetov Samara players
Russian Premier League players
FC Rostov players
FC Volga Nizhny Novgorod players
FC Nizhny Novgorod (2007) players
FC Torpedo Moscow players
FC Amkar Perm players
FC Torpedo-BelAZ Zhodino players
FC Nizhny Novgorod (2015) players
Belarusian Premier League players
FC Tekstilshchik Ivanovo players